Papanastasiou is a surname, and may refer to:

Alexandros Papanastasiou (1876–1936), Greek politician, sociologist and Prime Minister
Andreas Papanastasiou (born 1987), Cypriot footballer

Greek-language surnames
Surnames
Patronymic surnames